The Provincial Council of Zeeland, also known as the States of Zeeland, is the provincial council of Zeeland, Netherlands. It forms the legislative body of the province. Its 39 seats are distributed every four years in provincial elections.

History
During the rule of Charles V, the States of Zeeland was made up of prelates from the area (e.g. the abbot of the Onze Lieve Vrouwe Abdij in Middelburg), the main nobles of Zeeland (the Ridderschap) and representatives of the area's six largest cities (known as pensionaries). These cities were Middelburg, Zierikzee, Goes, Reimerswaal and Tholen (with Vlissingen and Veere added after the Dutch Revolt). Decisions were taken by majority vote and the body and area were represented at the States General of the Netherlands by the Grand Pensionary of Zeeland, with this regional states (like the others) also nominating Zeeland's members of the States-General. Its executive board was known as the Gecommitteerde Raden. From 1578, these, the Zeeuwse Admiraliteitscollege and other regional representatives oversaw the Admiralty of Zeeland.

Current composition
Since the 2019 provincial elections, the distribution of seats of the Provincial Council of Zeeland has been as follows:

See also
 States of Holland and West Friesland
 Provincial politics in the Netherlands

References

External links
  

Politics of Zeeland
History of Zeeland
Middelburg, Zeeland
Zeeland
Political history of the Dutch Republic